Stéphane Aubier (born October 8, 1964) is a Belgian film director and screenwriter. In 2009, he wrote and directed the animated film A Town Called Panic along with Vincent Patar. It premiered at the 2009 Cannes Film Festival and was the first stop-motion film to be screened at the festival. In 2013, he co-directed with Patar and Benjamin Renner the film Ernest & Celestine, which received widespread critical acclaim. The film received three Magritte Awards, including Best Film and Best Director for Aubier and Patar. It also received a nomination at the 86th Academy Awards, in the category of Best Animated Feature.

References

External links

1964 births
Living people
Belgian film directors
Belgian screenwriters
Magritte Award winners